"If You Were the Only Girl (In the World)" is a popular song, written by Nat D. Ayer with lyrics by Clifford Grey. It was written for the musical revue The Bing Boys Are Here, which premièred on 19 April 1916 at the Alhambra Theatre in Leicester Square, London.  The song was originally performed as a duet between Lucius Bing, played by George Robey, and his love interest Emma, originated by Violet Loraine.

The song was published in 1916 by B. Feldman & Co. and republished in 1946. It has become a standard, recorded by many artists.
In Aldous Huxley's The Genius and the Goddess, there is a comment about this "'disgusting' song and how it comes again after a (war) slaughter..."

Notable recordings
The first recording, 'the original cast recording', by the first performers to sing this song, George Robey and  Violet Loraine, was released on a 78rpm disc and became a hit. It was a popular recording during World War I, played in war zones as well as 'at home'. 
Perry Como - recorded on March 21, 1946, and released by RCA Victor Records as catalog number 20-1857-B, the B-side of "They Say It's Wonderful". This version reached No. 14 on the Billboard Records Most-Played on the Air chart. The recording was also released in the United Kingdom by EMI on the His Master's Voice label as catalog number BD-1165, the flip side of "I Dream of You (More than You Dream I Do)".
Peggy Lee as "If You Were the Only Boy in the World", a transcription for Capitol Records, recorded on July 29, 1946.
Donald Peers with two pianos recorded it at the Royal Albert Hall, London, on June 13, 1949, as the first song of a medley along with "Blue Skies" and "There's a Rainbow 'Round My Shoulder". The medley was released by EMI on the His Master's Voice label as catalog number B 9792.
Doris Day recorded the song for her 1953 Columbia Records album By the Light of the Silvery Moon and sang the song with Gordon MacRae in the 1953 film By the Light of the Silvery Moon
Gordon MacRae and June Hutton - for the Capitol Records album By the Light of the Silvery Moon (1953).
William Frawley recorded his version of this song for his 1958 album of classic songs, Bill Frawley Sings The Old Ones. 
Georgia Brown - as "If You Were the Only Boy in the World", for the album Sings a Little of What You Fancy (1962).
Kathy Kirby - as "If You Were the Only Boy in the World", for her album Kathy Kirby Sings 16 Hits from Stars and Garters (1963).
Dean Martin - for his album Dream with Dean (1964)
Barbra Streisand recorded this song under the title "If You Were the Only Boy in the World", with a Peter Matz arrangement for her album My Name Is Barbra in 1965.
Frankie Vaughan - for the album Love Hits & High Kicks (1985).
Anton Szandor LaVey, founder of The Church of Satan, performed the song on his 1990 album Satan Takes a Holiday.

Film and television appearances
Actor-singer Rudy Vallee sang it in the 1929 film The Vagabond Lover, with the beat changed from a foxtrot to a waltz.

The song is performed by Tommy Trinder and Jean Colin in the 1940 film, "Laugh it off".

Soldiers on a train are also heard singing this song in the 1942 Noël Coward film, In Which We Serve.

The song was sung by soldiers during a concert in the 1944 war drama, The Way Ahead.

The song was sung by Perry Como himself, with the Buffalo Bills joining in, in a 1958 episode of The Perry Como Show.

The song is performed at the entertainment evening in the 1957 film, The Bridge on the River Kwai, set during World War II.

The song was incorporated into the score of the 1959 television version of the musical Meet Me in St. Louis, and sung by Tab Hunter and Jane Powell.

David Abraham sings a line of this song in the movie Kotwal Saab (1977) to celebrate the news of marriage between his two paying guests.

Jeanette Nolan plays the first line on a piano and sings "If I was the only girl in the world..." to Steve Franken in the disaster movie Avalanche (1978).

The song was heard in the 2000 episode "Pardon My Past" of the television show Charmed.

The song was sung by a honeymooning couple in The Duchess of Duke Street, Series 2, Episode 8.

The song was sung for wounded British soldiers by the characters Lady Mary Crawley and Matthew Crawley (played by Michelle Dockery and Dan Stevens, respectively) in Series 2, Episode 4 of Downton Abbey, set in 1918 and broadcast in 2011. It was sung, ahistorically, in waltz (¾) time.

The song is played as a solo piano instrumental by the character Malcolm Hamilton in the BBC Scotland soap, River City, at the end of the 3 July 2012 episode.

Lyrics
Sometimes when I feel bad
and things look blue
I wish a pal I had... say one like you.
Someone within my heart to build her throne
Someone who'd never part, to call my own

If you were the only girl in the world
and I were the only boy
Nothing else would matter in the world today
We could go on loving in the same old way

A garden of Eden just made for two
With nothing to mar our joy
I would say such wonderful things to you
There would be such wonderful things to do
If you were the only girl in the world
and I were the only boy.

No-one I'll ever care for dear... but you.
No-one I'll fancy, therefore love me do.
Your eyes have set me dreaming all night long…
Your eyes have set me scheming, right or wrong

If you were the only girl in the world
and I were the only boy
Nothing else would matter in the world today
We could go on loving in the same old way

A garden of Eden just made for two
With nothing to mar our joy
I would say such wonderful things to you
There would be such wonderful things to do
If you were the only girl in the world
and I were the only boy.

References

External links
 "If You Were the Only Girl (in the World)" sung by Loraine and Robey, 1916 (mp3)
 "If You Were the Only Girl (in the World)" sheet music at the UCLA Music Library's Digital Archive of Popular American Music

1916 songs
Doris Day songs
Male–female vocal duets
Barbra Streisand songs
Songs with music by Nat Ayer